Alfred Hansen may refer to:
 Alfred G. Hansen (1933 – ), a United States Air Force general
 Alfred Hansen (cinematographer) (1885–1935), a German cinematographer 
 Alfred Hansen (footballer) (1913–1995), a Danish footballer